Solo is the musical outfit of Dutch musicians Michiel Flamman and Simon Gitsels. The duo released two albums, of which the latest Solopeople was the biggest success. The album released on label Excelsior Recordings spawned a Dutch top 20 hit with  Come Back To Me.

Biography

Songs ’n Sounds (2003–2005)
In 2003 Flamman and Gitsels team up under the name Solo. By then both have already paid their dues in the music industry. Flamman performed under the name J. Perkin and wrote songs for other artists. Gitsels worked as sessions musician for Mathilde Santing and Birgit. 

A year later the duo signs with Excelsior Recordings. On this label Solo releases its debut album Songs ‘n Sounds on 16 August. The record is produced by Martijn Groeneveld and contains contributions from Minco Eggersman (at the close of every day), Rowin Tettero (Mindmeners) and Marg van Eenbergen (Seedling). The latter two also support Flamman and Gitsels during live shows. In November Solo receives an Essent award.

Solopeople (2005–2006)
In January 2005 Solo performs at Noorderslag. In February the band supports Spinvis on his Lotus Europa tour, playing throughout the Netherlands. At the end of April Solo enters the studio to record the tracks of their second album. The recording sessions finish in November. In radio show 2 Meter Sessies the band previews a number of tracks. At the end of the year Solo also records a cover version of de Pingpongsong for a tribute album for Dutch singer Herman van Veen.

Solopeople, the band's second album, is released in January 2006. The Dutch press receives the record well and the band makes appearances in popular Dutch TV shows such as Barend & Van Dorp and De Wereld Draait Door. The band manages to sell out the rock club Ekko in Utrecht three times within a month. In the summer of 2006 the band manages to play at one of Europe's biggest festivals Lowlands twice. Solopeople's second single Opportunities follows in September.

Before we part (2007–2008)
In 2007 Solo works on new material and played at Touring Theater Festival De Parade. With befriended musicians they play songs written by Dutch composer Harry Bannink for the seventies television show De Stratemakeropzeeshow. In October Solo head for the studio. The recordings are only finished in April 2008 after working with Scott Solter and Aaron Prellwitz at Tiny Telephone studios in San Francisco, California. 

When the record is released in November, Solo is down to one man; Michiel Flamman. The album title refers to the breakup of the band. Flamman states in interviews that though Gitsels left the band Solo will continue and a new record is due to be released in April 2009. Meanwhile, the album is hailed as another piece of perfect songwriting.

References

Dutch musical groups